The 1992 Southland Conference men's basketball tournament was held March 6–8 at Convocation Center in San Antonio, Texas.

Northeast Louisiana defeated  in the championship game, 81–77, to win their third consecutive Southland men's basketball tournament.

The Indians received a bid to the 1992 NCAA Tournament as the No. 15 seed in the Midwest region.

Format
Six of the ten conference members participated in the tournament field. They were seeded based on regular season conference records, with the top two seeds receiving a bye to the semifinal round. Tournament play began with the quarterfinal round.

Bracket

References

Southland Conference men's basketball tournament
Tournament
Southland Conference men's basketball tournament
Southland Conference men's basketball tournament
Basketball competitions in San Antonio
College sports tournaments in Texas